Bethel Missionary Baptist Church is a historic Baptist church building at the junction of Webster and Lane Streets on the southeast corner in Tatums, Oklahoma.

The church building was completed in 1919. It was built in a Gable-end style. The church was a major part of community life in Tatums, and it is the oldest building from the town's early history that is still standing. It was added to the National Register of Historic Places in 1995.

References

Baptist churches in Oklahoma
Churches on the National Register of Historic Places in Oklahoma
Buildings and structures in Carter County, Oklahoma
National Register of Historic Places in Carter County, Oklahoma